Rednock School is a comprehensive school located in Dursley, Gloucestershire, England. It is a specialist Science College which also contains a sixth form.

General Information
The school opened in 1971 as a comprehensive school, having formerly served as the grammar school in the town of Dursley.

In 2009, the school underwent a complete re-build which saw a £38 million investment into developing an entirely new school site. 
It has many eco-friendly features such as a sedum roof and solar panels and was also shortlisted for the South West Built Environment Awards.
To celebrate the development of the newly built school, a book compiling details of the history of Rednock School was produced for the pupils.

Prime Minister's Global Fellowship 
The school has its first student attain a place on the Prime Minister's Global Fellowship programme in 2009.

Gallery

References

External links
 Website
 Rednock school information on schoolsnet.com

Secondary schools in Gloucestershire
Educational institutions established in 1971
1971 establishments in England
Foundation schools in Gloucestershire
Dursley